The Minister of Trade, Industry and Competition is a Minister in the Cabinet of South Africa. The portfolio of Trade, Industry and Competition, formed in May 2019, has brought together the former Ministry of Trade and Industry and Ministry of Economic Development.

The Minister is responsible for the development and implementation of industrial policy in South Africa. The ministry oversees 17 government agencies, providing for industrial funding, competition policy, black economic empowerment policy, consumer protection, trade policy and technical standards.

List of Past Ministers

Minister of Commerce and Industry, 1910–1912, 1933–1943

Minister of Trade and Industry, 1994–2019

Minister of Trade, Industry and Competition, 2019 - Present

References

External links
Department of Trade and Industry

Lists of political office-holders in South Africa